Ned F. Chiodo (born August 2, 1942) is an American politician in the state of Iowa.

Chiodo was born in Des Moines, Iowa. He attended Drake University and was a golf pro. He served in the Iowa House of Representatives from 1977 to 1985, as a Democrat (67th district from 1977 to 1983, and 81st district from 1983 to 1985). His son Frank Chiodo also served in the House of Representatives, from 1997 to 2005.

References

1942 births
Living people
Politicians from Des Moines, Iowa
Drake University alumni
Golfers from Iowa
Democratic Party members of the Iowa House of Representatives